Portrait of a Man is an oil on canvas painting by Titian (950,2x45,1 cm), dating to around 1512. Wilhelm von Bode attributed it to Giorgione and Richter to Palma il Vecchio, but Longhi, Suida, Phillips, Morassi, Pallucchini and Pignatti all attributed it to Titian.

Owned by the Grimani family in Venice, it passed through various owners, including W. Savage in London and Benjamin Altman in New York, who bequeathed it to the Metropolitan Museum in New York City in 1913.

Bibliography 
 Francesco Valcanover, L'opera completa di Tiziano, Rizzoli, Milano 1969.

References

Man
Paintings in the collection of the Metropolitan Museum of Art
1512 paintings